Miloslav Loos (20 January 1914 – 2 March 2010) was a Czech cyclist. He competed in the individual and team road race events at the 1936 Summer Olympics. Before his death, he became the oldest living Czech Olympic competitor.

References

External links
 

1914 births
2010 deaths
Czech male cyclists
Olympic cyclists of Czechoslovakia
Cyclists at the 1936 Summer Olympics
Sportspeople from Prague